The Sandlin Bug (Basic Ultralight Glider) is an American biplane, cable-braced, single-seat, ultralight glider that was designed by Mike Sandlin and is provided in the form of technical drawings for amateur construction.

Design and development

The Bug first flew in February 1999. The aircraft was designed to be an inexpensive and easy to fly three axis controlled aircraft similar to a primary glider, although the designer terms it an airchair. The Bug has an empty weight of under  and so qualifies to be operated under the United States FAR 103 Ultralight Vehicles regulations. The aircraft is made available as technical drawings, not plans, to allow potential builders to study them. Sandlin makes his computer assisted design drawings available free of charge as downloads in .dxf, .dwf and .gif formats and has explicitly released them to the public domain. The Bug 4 drawings comprise 66 sheets. The designer considers his aviation activities a hobby only.

The aircraft is made from bolted together aluminium tube, braced with steel cables and covered with heat shrunk Dacron fabric. Its  span wing uses V-shaped interplane struts. Controls are conventional three axis, with the ailerons and elevator controlled by a center stick and rudder controlled by pedals. The landing gear is a fixed monowheel gear. The pilot sits on an open cockpit seat without a windshield and is secured with a four-point harness. The aircraft is designed to be car-top transportable and can be assembled by one person.

The Bug is designed to be launched by aerotow behind an ultralight aircraft, auto-tow, winch-launch or by rolling it down a slope. It is flown for soaring and is not recommended for aerobatics.

Variants
Bug 2
Initial version, drawings no longer available.
Bug 4
Improved version, drawings still available.

Specifications (Bug 4)

See also

References

External links

1990s United States sailplanes
Homebuilt aircraft
Aircraft first flown in 1999
Biplanes